George Jones with Love is an album by American country music artist George Jones, released in 1971 on the Musicor Records label.

Background
Although Jones's final albums with Musicor have been criticized for their lackluster sound, George Jones With Love was a rebound from 1970's Will You Visit Me On Sunday?, which had only made it to number 44 on the country album chart; George Jones With Love made it to number nine.  Its opening track, "A Good Year For The Roses", climbed to number two on the singles chart.  Chris Woodstra of AllMusic calls the singer's vocal on the Jerry Chestnut song "one of his all-time greatest performances."  The song, which describes the thoughts of a man as his wife is preparing to leave him, features a particularly moving vocal from Jones, who manages to convey the sadness and profound bitterness that comes with a broken marriage.  "Possum Holler" is a novelty song written by Dallas Frazier that makes light of the singer's famous nickname, which he received from dee jay Slim Watts while working at KRTM in Beaumont in the 1950s.  "Never Grow Cold" is a duet with his wife Tammy Wynette that was also released on their 1971 duet album, We Go Together.

Reception
AllMusic states, "By 1970, George Jones' stay at Musicor had been marked by a glut of sloppy releases that would continually repackage and repeat material in different thematically based 'concept' albums; initially it would seem that George Jones With Love, with its lineup of all love-based songs, would fall into this disposable category. One listen, however, shows this to be an exception to the rule."

Track listing

External links
George Jones' Official Website

G
George Jones albums
Musicor Records albums
Albums produced by Bob Moore